The 3rd Alpini Regiment is a regiment of the Italian Army's mountain infantry speciality, the Alpini, which distinguished itself in combat during World War I and World War II. The regiment is based in Pinerolo and assigned to the Alpine Brigade "Taurinense".

History

Formation 
The 3rd Alpini Regiment was raised on 1 November 1882. It consisted of three battalions: Val Stura, Val Maira and Monti Lessini, named after the valleys and localities from which the battalion's soldiers were recruited. In 1886 the battalions were renamed, taking their new names from the location of their logistic depot: Fenestrelle, Susa and "Susa 2°".

In 1908 the composition of the regiment changed: the Pinerolo battalion was arrived from the 4th Alpini Regiment and the "Susa 2°" battalion was renamed "Exilles".

World War I 

The 3rd Alpini Regiment saw its first action in the Italo-Turkish War of 1911, fighting Ottoman forces in the Libyan desert. During World War I the regiment consisted of 13 battalions and saw heavy fighting in the Alps regions of the Italian front against Austro-Hungarian and German forces. During the war the regiment consisted of the following battalions (pre-war battalions in bold, followed by their first and second line reserve battalions):

  Pinerolo, Val Pellice, Monte Granero
  Fenestrelle, Val Chisone, Monte Albergian, Courmayeur
  Exilles, Val Dora, Monte Assietta
  Susa, Val Cenischia, Moncenisio

During the war a total of 2,375 officers and 32,300 soldiers served in the 3rd Alpini Regiment, of which 138 officers and 5,697 soldiers were killed, and 535 officers and 11,030 soldiers were wounded. The regiment's battalions were awarded three Silver Medals of Military Valour during the war, one of which was shared between the Susa and Exilles battalions for the conquest of Monte Nero.

Interwar years 
On 10 September 1935, the 1st Alpine Division "Taurinense" was formed, which consisted of the 3rd Alpini Regiment, 4th Alpini Regiment, and 1st Mountain Artillery Regiment. The division participated in 1936 in the Italian invasion of Abyssinia.

World War II 

In 1940 the regiment, as part of the Taurinense division, fought in the Italian attack on Greece. After the German invasion of Yugoslavia the Taurinense performed garrison and anti-partisan duties in Montenegro. After the announcement of the Armistice of Cassibile on 8 September 1943 most of the division was captured by German forces near Kotor, while the Alpini Battalion "Ivrea" and Alpine Artillery Group "Aosta" joined the Yugoslav Partisans and formed the Partisan Division "Garibaldi".

On 25 June 1944, the 3rd Alpini Regiment was re-raised in Southern Italy with the battalions "Piemonte" and "Monte Granero". Together with the 4th Bersaglieri Regiment it formed the 1st Italian Brigade of the Italian Liberation Corps, which fought in the war on the Allied side. After the Bersaglieri regiment had suffered heavy casualties the two regiments were merged on 30 September 1944 to form the Special Infantry Regiment, which entered the Combat Group "Legnano". The Combat Group was equipped with British weapons and materiel and fought as part of the Polish II Corps on the extreme left of the British 8th Army near the river Idice.

Cold War 

After World War II, only the Alpini Battalion "Susa" was reformed on 23 November 1945 and assigned to the 4th Alpini Regiment. The battalion carried on the traditions of the 3rd Alpini Regiment.

During the 1975 army reform the army disbanded the regimental level and newly independent battalions were given for the first time their own flags. On 10 October 1975 the 4th Alpini Regiment of the Alpine Brigade "Taurinense" was disbanded and on the same day the regiment's Alpini Battalion "Susa" in Pinerolo was assigned the flag and traditions of the 3rd Alpini Regiment.

Current structure 

On 23 November 1993 the Alpini Battalion "Susa" was elevated to 3rd Alpini Regiment without changing size or composition. As of 2022 the 2nd Alpini Regiment is based in Pinerolo and assigned to Alpine Brigade "Taurinense". The 3rd Alpini Regiment served in Kabul as part of Italy's contributions to the International Security Assistance Force until August 2007, when it was replaced by the 7th Alpini Regiment.

  Regimental Command
  Command and Logistic Support Company
  Alpini Battalion "Susa"
  34th Alpini Company "Lupi"
  35th Alpini Company "Vipera"
  36th Alpini Company "L’ardia"
  133rd Maneuver Support Company "La nobile"

The Command and Logistic Support Company fields the following platoons: C3 Platoon, Transport and Materiel Platoon, Medical Platoon, and Commissariat Platoon.

Equipment 
The Alpini companies are equipped with Bv 206S tracked all-terrain carriers, Puma 6x6 wheeled armored personnel carriers and Lince light multirole vehicles. The maneuver support company is equipped with 120mm mortars and Spike MR anti-tank guided missiles.

See also
 Italian Army
 Alpine Brigade Taurinense

External links 
 Official website
 3rd Alpini Regiment on vecio.it

Source 
 Franco dell'Uomo, Rodolfo Puletti: L'Esercito Italiano verso il 2000 - Volume Primo - Tomo I, Rome 1998, Stato Maggiore dell'Esercito - Ufficio Storico, page: 461

References 

Alpini regiments of Italy
Regiments of Italy in World War I
Regiments of Italy in World War II
Military units and formations established in 1882
Military units and formations disestablished in 1943
Military units and formations established in 1944
Military units and formations disestablished in 1945
Military units and formations established in 1993